Shahrak-e Vahdat or Shahrakvahdat may refer to:
 Shahrak-e Vahdat, Golestan
 Shahrak-e Vahdat, Ilam
 Shahrak-e Vahdat, Khuzestan
 Shahrak-e Vahdat, Kurdistan